This is a list of Uzbekistan women's international footballers who have played for the Uzbekistan women's national football team.

Players

See also 
 Uzbekistan women's national football team

References 

 
International footballers
International footballers
Uzbekistan
Football in Uzbekistan
Association football player non-biographical articles